Elisabeth Müller (18 July 1926 – 11 December 2006) was a Swiss actress.

Filmography

References

External links
 

1926 births
2006 deaths
Swiss film actresses
20th-century Swiss actresses
Actors from Basel-Stadt